Blubber is a thick layer of vascularized fat found under the skin of all cetaceans, pinnipeds, and sirenians.

Blubber may also refer to:

Art, entertainment, and media
 Blubber (novel), a 1974 children's novel by Judy Blume
 Blubber Bear, a fictional character in the television series Wacky Races

See also
 Blibber-Blubber
 Blubbering